"Sky Starts Falling" is the third and final single from English rock band Doves' third album, Some Cities (2005). It was released in the UK on 12 September 2005 on CD, DVD and 7-inch vinyl, and charted at number 45 on the UK Singles Chart. The B-sides include 2 different remixes of "Some Cities" by Echoboy and a remix of "The Storm" by unofficial fourth Doves band member Martin Rebelski.

Track listings

Charts

References

2005 singles
Doves (band) songs
Songs written by Jez Williams
Songs written by Jimi Goodwin
Songs written by Andy Williams (Doves)
Song recordings produced by Ben Hillier
2004 songs